Donald Glenn Brotzman (June 28, 1922 – September 15, 2004) was a U.S. Representative from Colorado.

History
Brotzman was born on a farm in near Sterling, Colorado in Logan County to Priscella Ruth Kittle Smith (1895–1986) and Harry Brotzman (1895–1959). He was educated in Logan County schools. He married Louise L. Reed on April 9, 1944. He served in the United States Army as a first lieutenant with the Eighty-first Infantry Division in the South Pacific from 1945 to 1946.

Brotzman graduated from the Business School of the University of Colorado at Boulder in 1949; it has since been renamed the Leeds School of Business. He graduated from the University of Colorado Law School in 1949. He was admitted to the bar in 1950 and began practice in Boulder, Colorado.

He served as member of the Colorado House of Representatives from 1952 to 1954. He served as member of the Colorado Senate from 1954 to 1956, serving as Republican caucus leader in 1956. He was the Republican gubernatorial nominee in 1954 and 1956. He was appointed United States Attorney for Colorado by President Eisenhower and served from 1959 to 1961.

Brotzman was elected as a Republican to the Eighty-eighth Congress (January 3, 1963 – January 3, 1965). He was an unsuccessful nominee in 1964 to the Eighty-ninth Congress. He was elected to the Ninetieth and to the three succeeding Congresses (January 3, 1967 – January 3, 1975). He was an unsuccessful candidate for reelection to the Ninety-fourth Congress in 1974.

Brotzman served as Assistant Secretary of the Army for Manpower and Reserve Affairs from 1975 to 1977. He also served as president of Rubber Manufacturers Association and National Rubber Shippers Association, and as chairman of the Industry Safety Council in Washington, D.C.

His wife of 51 years, Louise Reed Brotzman, died in 1995.

Brotzman died of cancer Sept. 15 at the Fountains at Washington House, a nursing home in Alexandria. He lived in Alexandria.

Survivors include his wife, Gwendolyn Davis Brotzman of Alexandria, whom he married in 1996; two children from his first marriage, Kathleen "Kathy" Caldwell of Longmont, Colo., and Donald G. "Chip" Brotzman Jr. of Carbondale, Colo.; a stepson, Robert Higgins of Philippi, W.Va.; a brother; and six grandchildren.

References

External links

1922 births
2004 deaths
20th-century American politicians
American people of German-Russian descent
Republican Party Colorado state senators
Republican Party members of the Colorado House of Representatives
People from Sterling, Colorado
Republican Party members of the United States House of Representatives from Colorado
United States Army civilians
United States Attorneys for the District of Colorado
University of Colorado Boulder alumni
University of Colorado Law School alumni
United States Army officers
United States Army personnel of World War II
Deaths from cancer in Virginia
Military personnel from Colorado